N. S. Vishwanathan was the deputy governor of Reserve Bank of India. He was appointed  on 28 June 2016, by the Appointments Committee of the Cabinet of Government of India. He replaced H. R. Khan, whose term ended on 4 July 2016.

Career 

Principal chief general manager in the department of non-banking supervision at Reserve Bank of India.
Executive director at Reserve Bank of India since April 2014. 
Director of Punjab National Bank from 6 September 2012, to 31 May 2013. 
Nominee director at Dena Bank Ltd. from 30 May 2011, to 6 September 2012. 
Chief general manager of vigilance at IFCI Ltd.

References

gets extension by one year as RBI deputy governor N.S Vishwanathan

Living people
Indian bankers
Reserve Bank of India
1958 births